Saptha elegans is a moth in the family Choreutidae. It was described by Walsingham 1900. It is found in India, Sri Lanka and on the Andaman Islands.

References

Natural History Museum Lepidoptera generic names catalog

Choreutidae
Moths described in 1900